Cyranorhis is an extinct genus of prehistoric bony fish from the Carboniferous period.

Classification
Based on the cladistic analysis by Ren & Xu, Cyranorhis was recovered in a sister group relationship with the Triassic Pteronisculus.

See also

 Prehistoric fish
 List of prehistoric bony fish

References

Prehistoric bony fish genera
Palaeonisciformes